Martin Dupkala (born 7 May 1985) is a Slovak football midfielder who currently plays for TJ ŠM Dulová Ves.

Club career

1. FC Tatran Prešov
Dupkala made his professional Fortuna Liga debut for Tatran Prešov against Zemplín Michalovce on 24 July 2016.

References

External links
 1. FC Tatran Prešov official club profile
 
 Eurofotbal profile
 Fotbal.idnes profile
 Futbalnet profile

1985 births
Living people
Slovak footballers
Slovak expatriate footballers
Association football midfielders
1. FC Tatran Prešov players
FK Bodva Moldava nad Bodvou players
FC Lokomotíva Košice players
Partizán Bardejov players
1. HFK Olomouc players
Slovak Super Liga players
Slovak expatriate sportspeople in the Czech Republic
Expatriate footballers in the Czech Republic
2. Liga (Slovakia) players